Pastina is a village in Tuscany, central Italy, administratively a frazione of the comune of Santa Luce, province of Pisa. At the time of the 2001 census its population was 284.

Pastina is about 45 km from Pisa and 2 km from Santa Luce.

References 

Frazioni of the Province of Pisa